A ruler, sometimes called a rule, line gauge, or scale, is an instrument used to make distance measurements whereby a user estimates a distance by reading from a series of markings called "rules" along an edge of the device. Commonly the instrument is rigid and the edge itself is a straightedge ("ruled straightedge") which additionally allows one to draw straight lines. Some rulers such as cloth or paper tape measures are non-rigid. Specialty rulers exist that have flexible edges that retain a chosen shape and these find use in sewing, arts, and crafts.

Rulers have been used since ancient times. They are commonly made from metal, wood, fabric, paper, and plastic. They are crucially important in the design and construction of buildings. Their ability to quickly and easily measure lengths makes them important to textile industry and to retailers where amounts of string, fabric, and paper goods can be cut to size. Children learn basic use of rulers at the elementary school level and are often part of a student's school supplies. At the high school level rulers are often used as straightedges for geometric constructions in Euclidean geometry. Rulers are ubiquitous in the engineering and construction industries, often in the form of a tape measure, and are used for making and reading technical drawings. Since much technical work is now done on computer, many software programs implement virtual rulers to help the user estimate virtual distances.

Variants

Rulers have long been made from different materials and in multiple sizes. Some are wooden. Plastics have also been used since they were invented; they can be molded with length markings instead of being scribed. Metal is used for more durable rulers for use in the workshop; sometimes a metal edge is embedded into a wooden desk ruler to preserve the edge when used for straight-line cutting.  in length is useful for a ruler to be kept on a desk to help in drawing. Shorter rulers are convenient for keeping in a pocket. Longer rulers, e.g., are necessary in some cases. Rigid wooden or plastic yardsticks, 1 yard long, and meter sticks, 1 meter long, are also used. Classically, long measuring rods were used for larger projects, now superseded by tape measure, surveyor's wheel or laser rangefinders.

Desk rulers are used for three main purposes: to measure, to aid in drawing straight lines, and as a straight guide for cutting and scoring with a blade.  Practical rulers have distance markings along their edges.

A line gauge is a type of ruler used in the printing industry. These may be made from a variety of materials, typically metal or clear plastic. Units of measurement on a basic line gauge usually include inches, agate, picas, and points. More detailed line gauges may contain sample widths of lines, samples of common type in several point sizes, etc.

Measuring instruments similar in function to rulers are made portable by folding (carpenter's folding rule) or retracting into a coil (metal tape measure) when not in use. When extended for use, they are straight, like a ruler.

A flexible length-measuring instrument which is not necessarily straight in use is the tailor's fabric tape measure, a length of tape calibrated in inches and centimeters. It is used to measure around a solid body, e.g., for a person's waist measurement, as well as for linear measurement, e.g., for the inside leg length. It is rolled up when not in use, taking up little space.

A Online ruler software program can be used to measure pixels on a computer screen or mobile phone. These programs are also known as screen rulers or online ruler. It is used to measure the actual size of an object in Inches, Centimeters(CM), and millimeters (MM).

Ruler applications in geometry 

In geometry, a ruler without any marks on it (a straightedge) may be used only for drawing straight lines between points. A straightedge is also used to help draw accurate graphs and tables.

A ruler and compass construction refers to constructions using an unmarked ruler and a compass. It is possible to bisect an angle into two equal parts with a ruler and compass. It can be proved, though, that it is impossible to divide an angle into three equal parts using only a compass and straightedge — the problem of angle trisection. However, should two marks be allowed on the ruler, the problem becomes solvable.

History

In the history of measurement many distance units have been used which were based on human body parts such as the cubit, hand and foot and these units varied in length by era and location. In the late 18th century the metric system came into use and has been adopted to varying degrees in almost all countries in the world. 

The oldest preserved measuring rod is a copper-alloy bar that dates from  2650 BCE and was found by the German Assyriologist Eckhard Unger while excavating at the Sumerian city of Nippur (present day Iraq). 

Rulers made of ivory were in use by the Indus Valley civilization period prior to 1500 BCE. Ancient bricks found throughout the region have dimensions that correspond to these units.

Anton Ullrich invented the folding ruler in 1851. Frank Hunt later made the flexible ruler in 1902.

Curved and flexible rulers
The equivalent of a ruler for drawing or reproducing a smooth curve, where it takes the form of a rigid template, is known as a French curve. A flexible device that can be bent to the desired shape is known as a flat spline, or (in its more modern incarnation) a flexible curve. Historically, a flexible lead rule used by masons that could be bent to the curves of a molding was known as a lesbian rule.

Philosophy
Ludwig Wittgenstein famously used rulers as an example in his discussion of language games in the Philosophical Investigations.  He pointed out that the standard meter bar in Paris was the criterion against which all other rulers were determined to be one meter long, but that there was no analytical way to demonstrate that the standard meter bar itself was one meter long.  It could only be asserted as one meter as part of a language game.

See also

 
 
 
 
 
 
 Scales: 
 
 and

References

Bibliography
 Cherry, Dan. "Collector's guide to rules", Furniture & Cabinetmaking, no. 259, July 2017, ISSN 1365-4292, pp. 52–6
 Rees, Jane and Mark (2010). The Rule Book: Measuring for the Trades. Lakeville, MN: Astragal Press  
 Russell, David R.; with photography by James Austin and foreword by David Linley (2010). Antique Woodworking Tools: Their Craftsmanship from the Earliest Times to the Twentieth Century,  Cambridge: John Adamson  , pp. 64–74 
 Whitelaw, Ian (2007). A Measure of All Things: The Story of Man and Measurement. Macmillan  

Length, distance, or range measuring devices
Metalworking measuring instruments
Stationery
Stonemasonry tools
Woodworking measuring instruments